Sergei Zvyagin (Russian: Сергей Звягин; born February 17, 1971, in Moscow, Russia) is a Russian ice hockey goaltender.

Career 
He started with Krylia Sovetov in the Russian Hockey League in 1990. He played for the Soviet Union at the 1991 World Junior Ice Hockey Championships. Moved to the United States in 1994 where he played for the Detroit Falcons ice hockey team. He also played with other hockey teams in the United States including Quad City Mallards, Michigan K-Wings, and San Antonio Dragons. He played in Roller Hockey International with the Oakland Skates and New Jersey Rockin' Rollers.  Zvyagin played in the 2006 European Champions Cup and was noted for stopping 4 goals in one game. He plays in his father's favorite team the Moscow Dynamo as a goaltender and joined then in September 2009 to Vityaz Podolsk.

Honours
IIHF European Champions Cup: 2006
Turnir na prizy LenVO: 2006

References

External links

1971 births
Living people
Adirondack IceHawks players
Detroit Falcons (CoHL) players
HC Dynamo Moscow players
HC Neftekhimik Nizhnekamsk players
HC Vityaz players
Kalamazoo Wings (1974–2000) players
Krylya Sovetov Moscow players
Lokomotiv Yaroslavl players
New Jersey Rockin' Rollers players
Quad City Mallards (CoHL) players
Quad City Mallards (UHL) players
Russian ice hockey goaltenders
Russian Penguins players
San Antonio Dragons players
Soviet ice hockey goaltenders
Ice hockey people from Moscow
Ottawa Loggers players